Andre Emmett (August 27, 1982 – September 23, 2019) was an American professional basketball player. He played college basketball for the Texas Tech Red Raiders, and was named a consensus All-American as a senior in 2004. He had brief stints in the National Basketball Association (NBA) with the Memphis Grizzlies and the New Jersey Nets after being selected in the second round of the 2004 NBA draft. Emmett was shot to death on September 23, 2019 in Dallas.

College career
Emmett played college basketball for 4 years for Bob Knight at Texas Tech University. He is currently the Red Raiders' 2nd all-time leading scorer and the 4th all-time leading scorer in the Big 12 behind Buddy Hield, LaceDarius Dunn, and fellow Red Raider Jarrius Jackson with 2,256 points. During his freshman year and playing for Coach James Dickey, Emmett earned his way into the starting lineup averaging 7.7 points and 3.6 rebounds per game. When Bob Knight arrived at Texas Tech in 2001, Emmett saw his scoring average improve to 18.7 which was good enough for 3rd in the conference behind Drew Gooden and Kareem Rush and 1st team All-Big 12 honors. His junior and senior year, Emmett proved to be one of the best scorers in college basketball averaging 21.8 and 20.6 points per game, respectively. He also earned Unanimous 1st team All-Big 12 honors his junior and senior year and consensus All-American honors his senior year. Emmett capped off his college career by winning the 2004 NCAA Slam Dunk Contest.

Professional career

2004–05 season
Emmett was selected by the Seattle SuperSonics with the 35th overall pick in the 2004 NBA draft. He was later traded to the Memphis Grizzlies in a draft night trade. He joined the Grizzlies for 2004 NBA Summer League. On July 7, 2004, he signed his first professional contract with the Grizzlies. In the 2004–05 season, he played a total of 8 games for the Grizzlies.

2005–06 season
Emmett re-joined the Grizzlies for the 2005 NBA Summer League. On August 3, 2005, Emmett was traded to the Miami Heat in a five-team trade involving the Memphis Grizzlies, Miami Heat, Boston Celtics, Utah Jazz, and New Orleans Hornets. On October 31, 2005, he was waived by the Heat. In November 2005, he was acquired by the Austin Toros of the NBA D-League.

2006–07 season
In July 2006, Emmett joined the Dallas Mavericks for the Las Vegas Summer League and the Seattle SuperSonics for the Rocky Mountain Revue. Later that year, he signed with a Lithuanian club BC Lietuvos rytas for the 2006–07 season. In December 2006, he left Lietuvos rytas. On January 19, 2007, he was acquired by the Los Angeles D-Fenders.

2007–08 season
Emmett joined the Houston Rockets for the 2007 NBA Summer League. In December 2007, he signed with the Liège Basket of Belgium for the rest of the 2007–08 season, subsequently finishing the best scorer (23.9 ppg) of the Belgian championship.

2008–09 season
Emmett joined the Indiana Pacers for the 2008 NBA Summer League. On September 29, 2008, he signed with the Philadelphia 76ers. However, he was waived by the 76ers on October 6. Later that month, he joined Élan Béarnais Pau-Orthez of France for the 2008–09 season. In January 2009, he left Pau-Orthez after playing in only 5 games. He later joined Marinos de Anzoátegui for the 2009 LPB season.

2009–10 season
In November 2009, he signed with the Shandong Lions of China for the 2009–10 season. In March 2010, he scored a (then) CBA-record 71 points in a game against the Jiangsu Dragons. Following the CBA season, he joined Mets de Guaynabo for the rest of the 2010 BSN season.

2010–11 season
In December 2010, he signed with Fujian Xunxing of China for the rest of the 2010–11 season. On March 25, 2011, he was acquired by the Reno Bighorns.

2011–12 season
On December 15, 2011, he was re-acquired by the Bighorns. On February 14, 2012, he signed a 10-day contract with the New Jersey Nets. On February 24, 2012, he returned to the Bighorns. In April 2012, he signed with Sporting Al Riyadi Beirut of Lebanon for the 2012 FLB League playoffs.

2012–13 season
Emmett joined the NBA D-League Select Team for the 2012 NBA Summer League. On October 1, 2012, he signed with the Chicago Bulls. However, he was waived by the Bulls on October 15.

In December 2012, Emmett signed with Amchit Club of Lebanon for the rest of the 2012–13 season. Following the FLB League season, he joined Cocodrilos de Caracas for the 2013 LPB season, but left after 5 games.

2013–14 season
In January 2014, Emmett joined Cocodrilos de Caracas for the 2014 FIBA Americas League. In April 2014, he joined Halcones Rojos Veracruz of Mexico before re-joining Cocodrilos de Caracas for the 2014 LPB season. On July 13, 2014, he signed with Piratas de Quebradillas of the BSN where he played one game.

2014–15 season
On November 1, 2014, Emmett was selected by the Fort Wayne Mad Ants in the second round of the 2014 NBA D-League draft. On February 4, 2015, he was named to the Futures All-Star team for the 2015 NBA D-League All-Star Game, the second time in his career. He went on to record 28 points, 4 rebounds and 4 steals, and was subsequently named the All-Star Game MVP.

On March 5, 2015, Andre Emmett left the Mad Ants and signed with the Meralco Bolts of the Philippine Basketball Association for the 2015 Governor's Cup campaign.

2015–16 season
On July 22, 2015, Emmett was selected by the KCC EGIS(전주 KCC 이지스) with the 5th overall pick in the 2015 KBL foreigner draft.

NBA career statistics

Regular season

|-
| style="text-align:left;"| 
| style="text-align:left;"| Memphis
| 8 || 0 || 3.5 || .333 || .000 || .600 || 0.3 || .0 || .0 || .0 || 0.9
|-
| style="text-align:left;"| 
| style="text-align:left;"| New Jersey
| 6 || 0 || 7.5 || .571 || .000 || .625 || 1.0 || 0.2 || 0.3 || 0.2 || 2.2
|-
|- class="sortbottom"
| style="text-align:center;" colspan="2"| Career
| 14 || 0 || 5.2 || .462 || .000 || .615 || 0.6 || 0.1 || 0.1 || 0.1 || 1.4

Death
Emmett died on September 23, 2019, after being shot in Dallas, Texas. He was taken to a hospital where he was later pronounced dead. He was 37 years old.

References

External links
 
 Andre Emmett at RealGM.com
 

1982 births
2019 deaths
African-American basketball players
All-American college men's basketball players
American expatriate basketball people in Belgium
American expatriate basketball people in China
American expatriate basketball people in France
American expatriate basketball people in Lebanon
American expatriate basketball people in Lithuania
American expatriate basketball people in Mexico
American expatriate basketball people in the Philippines
American expatriate basketball people in South Korea
American expatriate basketball people in Venezuela
American men's basketball players
Basketball players from Dallas
BC Rytas players
Big3 players
Capitanes de Arecibo players
Cocodrilos de Caracas players
Deaths by firearm in Texas
Élan Béarnais players
Fort Wayne Mad Ants players
Fujian Sturgeons players
Guaros de Lara (basketball) players
Halcones Rojos Veracruz players
Jeonju KCC Egis players
Liège Basket players
Marinos B.B.C. players
Memphis Grizzlies players
Meralco Bolts players
New Jersey Nets players
Reno Bighorns players
Philippine Basketball Association imports
Piratas de Quebradillas players
Seattle SuperSonics draft picks
Shandong Hi-Speed Kirin players
Shooting guards
Small forwards
Texas Tech Red Raiders basketball players
Al Riyadi Club Beirut basketball players
20th-century African-American people
21st-century African-American sportspeople
American men's 3x3 basketball players